is a Japanese television jidaigeki or period drama that was broadcast in 1978. The lead stars were Keiju Kobayashi and Shigeru Tsuyuguchi.

Characters 
Karaki Hanbei: Keiju Kobayashi
Tasuzo : Shigeru Tsuyuguchi
Karaki Junnosuke : Ikko Furuya
Bunta : Yasushi Ono
Kinroku : Tonppie Hidari
Umesuke : Masao Komatsu
Okoma : Kumiko Okae
Oine ; Yuko Natori

See also
Edo no Kaze

References

1978 Japanese television series debuts
1970s drama television series
Jidaigeki television series